Armando Christian Pérez (born January 15, 1981), known professionally by his stage name Pitbull, is an American rapper and businessman. He began his career in the early 2000s, recording reggaeton, Latin hip hop, and crunk music under a multitude of labels. In 2004, he released his debut album M.I.A.M.I. under TVT Records and the executive production of Lil Jon. Pitbull later released his second album, El Mariel, in 2006 and his third, The Boatlift, in 2007. His fourth album, Rebelution (2009), included his breakthrough hit single "I Know You Want Me (Calle Ocho)", which peaked at number two on the US Billboard Hot 100 and number four on the UK Singles Chart.

After rebranding himself as a pop artist, Pitbull's next English-language album, Planet Pit (2011), featured his first US number one single "Give Me Everything" (featuring Ne-Yo, Afrojack and Nayer). The single from his EP Meltdown (also included in a version of his album, Global Warming), titled "Timber" (featuring Kesha), hit No.1 in eighteen countries, including the United States and the United Kingdom. The next single from the album, "Feel This Moment" (featuring Christina Aguilera), was a Top 10 hit in the United States, Canada, Australia and the United Kingdom. He performed the song "We Are One (Ole Ola)" (with Jennifer Lopez and Claudia Leitte), which served as the official theme of the 2014 FIFA World Cup. Pitbull released his latest album Libertad 548 on September 27, 2019. The new album includes the RIAA Latin 9× Platinum hit single "No Lo Trates" (featuring Daddy Yankee and Natti Natasha). The album spawned RIAA Latin Platinum single "Me Quedaré Contigo" (also featuring Ne-Yo), and was certified RIAA Latin Platinum on January 28, 2021.

Pitbull has sold over 25 million studio albums and over 100 million singles worldwide. He has over 15 billion views on YouTube as of May 2020. He was ranked by Billboard as the 45th Top Artist of the 2010s and the 24th Top Latin Artist of the 2010s. Pitbull's other ventures include brand ambassadorship and for various entities, activism and philanthropy in the Latino American community, a radio station (Pitbull's Globalization) on Sirius XM Radio and ownership of the Trackhouse Racing NASCAR team. As of May 2019, Pitbull has won 35 Billboard Latin Music Awards.

Early life and background
Armando Christian Pérez was born on January 15, 1981, in Miami, Florida, to Cuban immigrant parents. While growing up, he was strongly encouraged by his family to "take advantage" of the privilege of living in America, and the opportunities it came with. His family has a history of fighting against the Castro regime in Cuba. When he was three, he could recite the works of Cuban national hero and poet, José Martí, in Spanish. He learned English by watching Sesame Street as a child. His father was largely absent from his childhood; his parents separated when he was young, and he was raised mostly by his mother, later stating: "my mom is my father and my mother." He briefly stayed with a foster family in Roswell, Georgia. His parents struggled with substance abuse; as a teenager, he was also involved with drug use and dealing, which eventually led to him getting kicked out of the family house. He attended South Miami Senior High School and Miami Coral Park High School. While growing up, he was influenced by the Miami bass genre of pop music and has cited Celia Cruz and Willy Chirino as sources of inspiration, in addition to rappers such as Nas, Jay-Z, and Snoop Dogg. He stated that Miami's melting pot characteristics exposed him to various cultures which influenced his artistry and himself as a person.

He said he chose his stage name of Pitbull because the dogs "bite to lock. The dog is too stupid to lose. And they're outlawed in Dade County. They're basically everything that I am. It's been a constant fight". After meeting Lil Jon in Miami, Pitbull was featured on Lil Jon and the East Side Boyz' album Kings of Crunk in 2002. Pitbull's song "Oye" was featured on the soundtrack to the film 2 Fast 2 Furious the following year. In addition, Pitbull released several mixtapes, composed of freestyles and remixes of popular rap music. Pitbull also worked with Uncle Luke during his early career, being featured on Luke's 2001 album Somethin' Nasty, including the single "Lollipop" along with Lil' Zane.

Career

2001–2003: Luke Records and TVT Records
In 2001, Pitbull was signed to Luther Campbell's Luke Records by Jullian Boothe, then the label's vice-president of A&R. In 2001, Pitbull was introduced to Robert Fernandez of Famous Artist Music & Management, an independent label and management company specializing in developing artists, by the Diaz Brothers, a producer duo signed to the company. Fernandez "saw the eagerness and hunger he had" and, with the Luke Records deal ending, began working to develop Pitbull. Together they focused on creating a more radio-friendly sound. Fernandez later told HitQuarters: "At that time his music had a lot of verses and took a long time to get into the hook, and so we took time in getting the songs catchier and less on the rap side." 

Fernandez introduced Pitbull to Lil Jon, hoping to secure the rapper a small guest intro spot on Lil Jon's upcoming album Kings of Crunk. According to Fernandez, Jon took a liking to Pérez and offered him a track on the album; it is called "Pitbull's Cuban Ride Out". This track helped raise the young rapper's profile.

2004–2005: M.I.A.M.I. 

In 2004, Pitbull released his debut album M.I.A.M.I., with the lead single being "Culo"  produced by Lil Jon and the Diaz Brothers. It peaked at No. 32 on the Billboard Hot 100 chart and No. 11 on the Hot Rap Tracks chart. Other singles included "Dammit Man", "Back Up", "Toma", and "That's Nasty" (both featuring Lil Jon). He joined the Anger Management Tour, the 2000 hip-hop concert tour headlined by Eminem and 50 Cent. Pitbull also appeared on the Ying Yang Twins' single "Shake", which peaked at No.41 on the Hot 100 and No.12 on the rap chart, Adassa's chart topping single "Kamasutra" & Twista's "Hit the Floor" (#94 Hot 100, No. 20 Rap). Remix album Money Is Still a Major Issue was released in November 2005; it included new track "Everybody Get Up", a duet with hip-hop/R&B group Pretty Ricky.

TVT Records, Pitbull's label at the time, and Slip-n-Slide Records disputed over the release of Welcome to the 305, an unreleased album by Slip-n-Slide that Pitbull recorded in 2001. A Miami judge ruled that Slip-n-Slide had a legal right to release the album as it was recorded when Pitbull was a Slip-N-Slide artist, and prior to him signing with TVT Records. A US District Court judge affirmed the decision further. TVT was then ordered in March 2007 to pay Slip-n-Slide $9.1 million for attempting to block the album's release to record stores and digital download entities.

In 2005, Pitbull and rapper Sean 'Diddy' Combs co-founded Bad Boy Latino, a subsidiary of Combs' Bad Boy Records label. It primarily focuses on Latin hip hop, Latin soul, Latin pop and other tropical music and has offices in New York and Miami, Florida. Along with co-founding it, Pérez currently heads the A&R division of the label.

2006–2007: El Mariel and The Boatlift
In January 2006, Pitbull guest-starred in UPN's South Beach. Pitbull recorded "Nuestro Himno" in collaboration with Wyclef Jean, Carlos Ponce, and Olga Tañón. On Listennn... the Album, the debut album by Terror Squad member and Miami radio personality DJ Khaled, Pitbull performed on three singles: "Holla at Me" and "Born-N-Raised" alongside other Southern-based rappers.

He dedicated the album to his father, who died in May that year. Along with the usual party-oriented tracks, Pitbull also included politically themed tracks in El Mariel. The album was released on October 31, 2006, and included singles "Bojangles", "Ay Chico (Lengua Afuera)", "Fuego", and duet with Puerto Rican singer Ken-Y, "Dime (Remix)". El Mariel topped the Billboard independent albums chart and peaked at No. 17 on the Billboard 200 and No. 2 on the rap chart.

Pitbull's third album, titled The Boatlift, was released on November 27, 2007, spawned by the single "Secret Admirer" featuring Lloyd on the chorus. Earlier, Pitbull announced that this album would have a more gangsta rap edge than his earlier albums. Subsequent singles included "Go Girl" featuring Trina, and "The Anthem" featuring and produced Lil Jon, that song sampling the hook from the song "El Africano" by Wilfrido Vargas and the beat from the song "Calabria" by Rune RK. "Go Girl" peaked at No. 80 on the Billboard Hot 100 and No. 36 on the Hot Rap Tracks chart; "The Anthem" No. 36 on the Hot 100 and No.11 on the Hot Rap Tracks.

His variety show, Pitbull's La Esquina, debuted May 2007 and ran through 2009 on the mun2 cable network.

Pitbull also appeared on DJ Laz' "Move Shake Drop" and DJ Felli Fel's "Feel It".

2008–2010: Pitbull Starring in Rebelution and Armando 

For his fourth studio album Pitbull Starring in Rebelution, Pitbull released "I Know You Want Me (Calle Ocho)" through Ultra Records after his former label TVT Records went out of business. "Krazy" peaked at No. 30 on the Hot 100 and No. 11 on the Hot Rap Tracks charts. "I Know You Want Me" peaked at No. 2 on the Hot 100 and peaked within the top ten spots of charts in the United Kingdom, Canada, Italy, and the Netherlands. The song reached No. 1 in France and the European Hot 100 in the week ending August 29, 2009 according to Billboard magazine. "I Know You Want Me" ended at position 17 on the Billboard Year-End Hot 100 singles of 2009. He later signed with Polo Grounds Music through Sony Music and created his own label Mr. 305 Inc. The single "Hotel Room Service", which samples "Push the Feeling On", peaked at No. 9 on the Hot 100. The album went on to sell over 7.5 million worldwide digital singles and albums combined.

On their second collaboration since "Go Girl", Pitbull appeared on the debut single of rapper David Rush (formerly Young Bo$$), "Shooting Star", also with Kevin Rudolf and LMFAO. An amateur video of Pitbull punching a disruptive audience member at a Colorado concert leaked onto the Internet in late May 2009. Pitbull explained to MTV News that it was because the fan kept throwing cash around the stage, and after Pitbull pulled him up to the stage, he threw a stash of money right in Pitbull's face. He was tapped by the Miami Dolphins to work alongside T-Pain and Jimmy Buffett to release a new fight song for the Dolphins. The city of Miami granted Pitbull a "Key to the City" honor on August 19, 2009. Another popular single from 2009 was "Blanco", featuring Pharrell Williams of The Neptunes from the soundtrack to the movie Fast & Furious. Pitbull recorded a remix with Mexican pop diva Paulina Rubio for her single "Ni Rosas Ni Juguetes" in November 2009.

In 2010, Pitbull performed the rap section in the Haiti benefit song "Somos El Mundo", a Spanish version of "We Are the World", that included a huge group of Latin artists led by Emilio and Gloria Estefan. He was also a featured guest on Janet Jackson's "Heart, Beat, Love" in addition to "Armada Latina", the fourth single off the album Rise Up by Latin rap legends, Cypress Hill. The song was produced by Jim Jonsin and also features Marc Anthony. Pitbull then collaborated with Alexandra Burke on the single "All Night Long". He was also featured on "DJ Got Us Fallin' in Love" by Usher.

Pitbull released his full-length debut Spanish-language album titled Armando on November 2, 2010. He was also one of the most nominated artists of the 2011 Billboard Latin Music Awards. He garnered seven nominations for "Latin Rhythm Airplay, Song of the Year" for "Bon, Bon"; "Latin Rhythm Airplay, Artist of the Year, Solo Artist"; "Latin Rhythm Albums, Album of the Year" for Armando; "Latin Rhythm Albums, Artist of the Year, Solo Artist"; "Social 50, Latin Artist of the Year"; "Latin Digital Download of the Year" for "Bon, Bon" and "Hot Latin Song of the Year, Vocal Event" for the song "I Like It" alongside Enrique Iglesias. He also won Telehit's award for "Most Popular Artist".

2011: Planet Pit 

In April 2011, Jennifer Lopez released Love?, which featured Pitbull on two singles. "Fresh Out the Oven" did not meet with critical or popular success, but the second cut, "On the Floor", was a certified hit. The single went on to make its Billboard Hot 100 debut at number nine, becoming the highest debuting Hot 100 single of Lopez's career.

Pitbull released Planet Pit on June 17, 2011. Pitbull collaborated with T-Pain on its first single, which became a moderate hit; "Hey Baby (Drop It to the Floor)", which peaked at No. 7 on the Hot 100.

On March 22, 2011, Pitbull released his second single, "Give Me Everything", which features American R&B singer Ne-Yo, American singer Nayer and Dutch DJ Afrojack, who also produced the song and co-wrote it with Matt Howard, Pitbull and Ne-Yo.; three months later, the song became Pitbull's first single to top the Billboard Hot 100. It was ranked No. 5 on the 2011 Billboard Year-End Chart.

In August 2011, Lindsay Lohan sued Pitbull, Ne-Yo and Afrojack in response to the song's lyrics referencing her name, "I've got it locked up like Lindsay Lohan." Lohan objected to the negative connotation of the line and claimed that she should have been compensated for the use of her name in the song. The case was dismissed by a federal judge, who ruled the tune's lyrics are protected by the First Amendment, which covers freedom of speech and creative expression.

2012–2013: Global Warming, Meltdown & Men in Black 3 

On October 7, 2011, RCA Music Group announced it was disbanding J Records along with Arista Records and Jive Records. With the shutdown, Pitbull (and all other artists previously signed to these three labels) would release future material on the RCA Records brand.

On May 8, 2012, he collaborated with the Italian DJ Gabry Ponte for the song "Beat on My Drum".

Pitbull's seventh studio album was titled "Global Warming" and released on November 16, 2012. Pitbull explained that the title reflected the fact that, much like the phenomenon of global warming, he's been around for a while but all of a sudden, people are paying attention. The lead single from the album was "Get It Started" featuring singer Shakira. The third single was "Feel This Moment" featuring Christina Aguilera.

The second single, entitled "Back in Time", was for the film Men in Black 3. It was the first lead single for the Men in Black franchise not performed by Will Smith. The song, which plays during the end credits but is not featured on the soundtrack album, samples "Love Is Strange" by Mickey & Sylvia. Pitbull supported the album with a world tour in the summer of 2013.

In 2013, Pitbull released a diss track towards Lil Wayne called "Welcome 2 Dade County" shortly after Lil Wayne's rant on the Miami Heat. Pitbull made his film debut in Epic with a voice role of the character "Bufo". He embarked on the North American/Australian Summer Tour with Kesha to promote both their albums, which extends from May to November.

He released his song "Feel This Moment" featuring Christina Aguilera on January 18, 2013, and they performed it live at the 2013 Billboard Music Awards, as well as on the fourth season of The Voice. The song was a commercial success, peaking at No. 8 on the Billboard Hot 100. Later he released the final single from his Global Warming album, Outta Nowhere featuring Danny Mercer, in late May. At the 2013 Latin Grammy Awards, Pitbull won the award for Best Urban Performance for his song "Echa Pa'lla (Manos Pa'rriba)".

Pitbull announced via Twitter that he would release the extended play to his studio album Global Warming, named Global Warming: Meltdown on November 25, featuring guest appearances from Kesha, Kelly Rowland, Inna, Mohombi and Mayer Hawthorne. The lead single, "Timber", featuring recording artist and tourmate Kesha, was released on October 7. The song peaked at No. 1 on the Billboard Hot 100 in 18 countries.

Pitbull was featured on the early summer single "Live It Up", marking his third collaboration with Jennifer Lopez and Redone. Lopez and Pitbull performed the song at the Billboard Music Awards, American Idol and Premios Juventud. He also made album appearances for Priyanka Chopra, Flo Rida, Jessica Mauboy, Belinda, Jason Derulo and other artists. Pitbull provided the post-race concert at the Formula 1 United States Grand Prix at Circuit of the Americas on November 17, 2013. Pitbull hosted the 2013 American Music Awards on November 24, 2013.

2014–2015: Globalization and Dale
 
Pitbull, Jennifer Lopez and Claudia Leitte performed the song "We Are One" at the opening ceremony of the 2014 World Cup.

On February 25, 2014, Pitbull released a new single titled "Wild Wild Love" featuring American recording artist group G.R.L. It has peaked at number 30 on the Billboard Hot 100.

On April 15, 2014, Pitbull released a single featuring Jennifer Lopez and Claudia Leitte called "We Are One (Ole Ola) from the compilation album for the FIFA 2014 World Cup One Love, One Rhythm.

In May 2014, it was announced that Pitbull would host and co-produce a live New Year's Eve concert special from Miami for Fox, Pitbull's New Year's Revolution, on December 31, 2014.

 
On June 12, 2014, Pitbull performed at the Arena de São Paulo as part of the 2014 FIFA World Cup opening ceremony. This performance saw him joined by Jennifer Lopez and Claudia Leitte to perform the tournament's official song "We Are One (Ole Ola)".

In June 2014, it was announced that Pitbull would be receiving a star on the Hollywood Walk of Fame.

On July 8, 2014, Pitbull released a Spanish-language single titled "Como Yo Le Doy" featuring Don Miguelo. On July 23, 2014, Pitbull released another single titled "Fireball", which features singer John Ryan Produced by Honua Music. Around the same time, he announced his eighth studio album Globalization, which was released on November 21, 2014.

On October 18, 2014, Pitbull released another single titled "Celebrate" which was included on the Penguins of Madagascar soundtrack and later included on the album Globalization. Globalization was released alongside single "Time of Our Lives", which was Pitbull's first top ten hit since "Timber", peaking at #9 on the Hot 100. It also topped the Hot Dance Club Songs, Hot Rap Songs, and Rhythmic charts.  On November 20, 2014, Pitbull released another Spanish-language single titled "Piensas (Dile la Verdad)" featuring Gente de Zona.

On April 21, 2015, Pitbull released his sixth single on the Globalization album titled "Fun" featuring Chris Brown and peaked at number 40 on the Hot 100. On May 8, 2015, Pitbull released a teaser video on Twitter of his upcoming second Spanish studio album and ninth studio album overall titled Dale. The album was officially released on July 17, 2015, and included the singles "Como Yo Le Doy", "Piensas (Dile la Verdad)", "El Taxi", and "Baddest Girl in Town". The album led to Pitbull winning his Grammy Award in the category of Best Latin Rock, Urban or Alternative Album.

2015–2018: Climate Change, Greatest Hits, and Gotti
On October 26, 2015, Pitbull released a new single titled "Free.K", which samples Adina Howard's "Freak like Me" in the chorus. The song was set to be the first single off his tenth studio album titled Climate Change. On January 7, 2016, Pitbull premiered the second single from his new album titled "Freedom", which also samples The Rolling Stones song "I'm Free" in the chorus. To coincide with the release of the single, the artist also teased a 2017 Norwegian party cruise. There is a campaign that launched in January 2016 in support of the cruise that is expected to last until later in the year. On February 14, 2017, Pitbull announced that Climate Change would be released on March 17, with pre-orders starting on February 17.

Pitbull collaborated with American girl group Fifth Harmony on "Por Favor" (released October 27, 2017) before announcing his 5th compilation album, titled Pitbull Greatest Hits. The thirteen track album features eleven of Pitbull's most successful leading artist songs, accompanied by "Jungle (with Stereotypes featuring Abraham Mateo and E-40)" and "Locas (featuring Lil' Jon)", two brand new Pitbull songs. The deluxe edition of the album released exclusively in Japan featured a 14th track, "Celebrate". The compilation album was released worldwide on December 1, 2017.

Pitbull released his first full-length soundtrack album for the film Gotti alongside Jorge Gómez on June 16, 2018. Pitbull is featured on two tracks on the album, "So Sorry" and "Amore" (featuring Leona Lewis).

2019–2020: YouTube history and Libertad 548
Pitbull collaborated with Indian singer-songwriter Guru Randhawa on the song "Slowly Slowly", released by T-Series on April 19, 2019. The song's music video received 38 million views on YouTube within 24 hours, becoming one of the world's all-time most-viewed music videos in 24 hours.

Pitbull's eleventh studio album, Libertad 548, was released on September 27, 2019. The album included the Spanish hit single "No Lo Trates" featuring Daddy Yankee and Natti Natasha, which is RIAA Latin certified 6× Platinum (360,000+ sales). The album's second single "3 to Tango" went viral for John Travolta's surprise guest appearance in the song's official music video. The album's third single "Me Quedaré Contigo" was premiered at the 2019 Latin American Music Awards, and peaked at #1 on the Latin Airplay and Latin Rhythm Airplay Billboard charts in the United States. The album's first promotional single, "Winning" featuring Yomil y El Dany, is a part of the Boost Mobile "Dale Más" advertising campaign. The album's fourth single "Get Ready" featuring Blake Shelton, which was premiered live by Pitbull at the Super Bowl LIV Tailgate Tropicale pre-game show, was later added to the "Dale Más" advertising campaign for a series of pre-game Super Bowl commercials for Super Bowl LIV, and a remixed version of the single serves as the official theme song for the 2020 NASCAR Cup Series. The album's second promotional single, "Cinco de Mayo" with Lil Jon featuring Chesca, was released on May 5, 2020. The promotional single was performed live at the Premio Lo Nuestro 2020, and the performance gained over 2 million views on YouTube as of July 2020. The album's fifth single, "Mueve La Cintura" featuring Tito El Bambino and Guru Randhawa, was released on June 8, 2020. An accompanying music video, which was filmed in 2019 and directed by David Rousseau, was also premiered on that same date. On July 17, 2020, the remix of "Mala", the original of which is found on Libertad 548, was released as a single. The song, titled "Mala (Remix)", features Becky G and additional guest vocals from De La Ghetto.

In 2020, amid the COVID-19 pandemic, LiveXLive launched a partnership with Pitbull, which would grant the platform exclusive rights to concerts, behind-the-scenes, videos and more from Pitbull to be streamed to LiveXLive's premium subscribers. On August 14, 2020, Pitbull released a new single, titled "Te Quiero Baby (I Love You Baby)" with Latin pop singer Chesca and American singer Frankie Valli. The single serves as a Latin interpolation of the original Frankie Valli & The Four Seasons 1967 smash hit single "Can't Take My Eyes Off You".

2021–present: Returning to touring
On June 22, 2021, Pitbull announced across all of his official social media platforms the I Feel Good Tour, named after his single of the same name, and his first dedicated tour since 2017's Enrique Iglesias and Pitbull Live! North American tour. The 32 city tour featured special guest Iggy Azalea and began on August 20, 2021, in Clarkston, Michigan and spanned across the United States through October 13, 2021 in Tampa, Florida. On February 24, 2022, Pitbull performed with IAMCHINO and DJ Deorro on the live-debut of their late-2021 single, "Discoteca", at the 2022 Premio Lo Nuestro awards. The song samples "Around the World (La La La La La)" by Eurodance group ATC.

On April 11, 2022, Pitbull announced the Can't Stop Us Tour with Iggy Azalea and Sean Paul. This marks the second consecutive year Pitbull has toured with Iggy Azalea. Pitbull and Sean Paul have previously collaborated on their hit song, "Shake Señora", from Pitbull's sixth studio album, Planet Pit (2011). The tour began on July 28, 2022 in Raleigh, North Carolina and concluded in Hollywood, Florida on October 19, 2022.

Product endorsements
In 2010, Pitbull took part in the "So Kodak" campaign for the Kodak brand with Drake, Rihanna, and Trey Songz. He also launched a partnership with the soft drink giant Dr Pepper as part of the campaign "Vida 23" for which he recorded a song that featured on his album Armando. Pitbull also announced he has become the spokesperson for Voli Vodka, in which he holds a majority equity stake, and Budweiser has chosen Pitbull to promote its Bud Light line of beer. The commercials currently highlight Pitbull dancing and gyrating on stage holding up a bottle of Bud Light. Pitbull has also purchased an equity stake in Miami Subs Pizza and Grill.

In 2012, Pitbull was involved in an advertising campaign with Walmart, in which the Walmart store that received the most Facebook "likes" from June 18 to July 15, 2012, would have Pitbull visit and put on a show there. An orchestrated campaign entitled "#exilepitbull" started by The Boston Phoenix reporter David Thorpe and SomethingAwful.com writer Jon Hendren urged people to vote for a remote location, namely Kodiak, Alaska. In an email to the Associated Press, Walmart confirmed that Kodiak was the winning location. Pitbull visited Kodiak on July 30, where he received a key to the city from Mayor Patricia Branson and performed. David Thorpe, who had started the "#exilepitbull" campaign, was invited to attend and showed up.

In November 2013, he started a fragrance with Jacavi Worldwide and Parlux Ltd.

On May 19, 2015, Pitbull launched a new radio channel on Sirius XM Radio, called Pitbull's Globalization Radio, which is centered around Rhythmic, Dance/EDM, and R&B/Hip-Hop product from artists from around the world. The artist celebrated the channel's debut with a private concert at New York City's Apollo Theater. In addition to launching his customized radio station, Pitbull also plans to launch a pair of projects with Endemol for digital television.

In 2019, Pitbull joined Boost Mobile to create a series of advertisements to expand Boost Mobile to Spanish communities. The promotional single "Winning" featuring Yomil y El Dany from Pitbull's 2019 album "Libertad 548" was used in the Boost Mobile "Dale Más" advertising campaign that has been actively rolling out advertisements starring Pitbull and his backup dance group The Most Bad Ones. The song "Get Ready" by Pitbull featuring Blake Shelton was later added to the advertising campaign, also from the Pitbull album Libertad 548.

On February 2, 2020, Pitbull was featured in a Super Bowl commercial for Super Bowl LIV, alongside Jennifer Lopez, DJ Khaled, Alex Rodriguez, and Steven Van Zandt. The commercial was produced to promote Hard Rock and its affiliations; the commercial premiered during the 2nd quarter of Super Bowl LIV. The commercial showcases the Seminole Hard Rock Hotel & Casino, which is also where the music video for "Get Ready" by Pitbull featuring Blake Shelton was filmed. The music video was released on February 10, 2020.

Controversies 

Pitbull has been criticized for the way women are depicted in some of his music. For example, song lyrics such as "She say she won't, but I bet she will," and "I like that when you fight back" have attracted discussion about whether or not they could be contributing to the "legitimization" of rape. Campaign described him as an artist "whose lyrics are routinely labeled sexist"; Complex similarly noted that "many view Pitbull as sexist."

Pitbull's song "We Are One (Ole Ola)" (featuring Jennifer Lopez and Claudia Leitte), which served as the official FIFA World Cup 2014 song, drew some controversy for not being a good enough representation of Brazil, which was the host country of the World Cup that year. Critics condemned the song's lyrical content for being filled with cliches about Brazilian culture, as well as for not containing enough lyrics in Portuguese. Others called it a "bad, boring, replaceable pop song."

In December 2019, Cuban music duo Gente de Zona were banned from performing at a New Year's Eve concert in Miami alongside Pitbull due to their support of the Cuban government. During the concert, Pitbull voiced his support for the duo amid the ban, stating that "music is music, politics is politics." He received immediate backlash for the comments, including from fellow Cuban musicians, such as Albita Rodríguez and Arturo Sandoval, and the Miami community. He later apologized, acknowledged he "screwed up," and claimed he was not fully aware of the extent of Gente de Zona's controversial political stances.

In 2020, during the COVID-19 pandemic, Pitbull made an appearance in a podcast episode where he claimed the pandemic was a conspiracy, called it a "scamdemic, plandemic," and spread false claims about the origins of it. A shorter clip of the podcast episode started going viral in early 2021, as social media users shared it hundreds of thousands of times. He received backlash for spreading misinformation about COVID-19, and was labeled a "conspiracy theorist" by some.

Business activities
On January 15, 2021, it was announced that Pitbull became a co-owner of the NASCAR Cup Series team Trackhouse Racing.

Impact and activism
Determined to help the Latino community in his hometown, Pitbull's social impact focus for the last decade has been closing the poverty gap through educational initiatives. He helped start a Tuition-Free Public charter for middle and high school called Sports Leadership and Management (SLAM!), which opened in 2013 in Miami's Little Havana, the neighborhood where Pitbull grew up. SLAM! now operates nationwide, including in Miami, Las Vegas and Atlanta, with a 96 percent graduation rate. The school will be run by the non-profit Mater Academy.

Pitbull created the Sports Leadership and Management Charter School, which opened in 2013.

In response to the destruction caused by Hurricane Maria, Pitbull announced he will use his private plane to bring cancer patients from Puerto Rico to the mainland United States for treatment.

On April 13, 2020, Pitbull released a single titled "I Believe That We Will Win (World Anthem)" (which samples the "I believe that we will win!" chant) during the COVID-19 pandemic. The song aims to inspire those affected by the COVID-19 outbreak to "face everything and rise". An accompanying music video was released on May 7, 2020, on YouTube, and made its television debut on MTV. Pitbull is donating all proceeds from song sales, streaming and views to Feeding America and the Anthony Robbins Foundation.

Pitbull is a vocal critic of communism and the Cuban government, having called on world leaders to support the 2021 protests against the Communist Party of Cuba.

On December 31, 2020, Pitbull performed for a crowd of first responders in Times Square during the COVID-19 pandemic for New Year's Eve.

Discography

 M.I.A.M.I. (2004)
 El Mariel (2006)
 The Boatlift (2007)
 Pitbull Starring in Rebelution (2009)
 Armando (2010)
 Planet Pit (2011)
 Global Warming (2012)
 Globalization (2014)
 Dale (2015)
 Climate Change (2017)
 Libertad 548 (2019)

Concert tours
2009–2011: Rebelution Tour
2012: Planet Pit World Tour
2013: North American Tour 2013 (with Kesha)
2015: Pitbull Live in Hong Kong
2016: The Bad Man Tour (with Prince Royce and Farruko)
2017: Enrique Iglesias and Pitbull Live! (with Enrique Iglesias)
2021: I Feel Good Tour (with Iggy Azalea)
2022: Can't Stop Us Now Tour (with Iggy Azalea and Sean Paul)

Opening act
 2014–2015: Enrique Iglesias – Sex and Love Tour
 2018: Britney Spears – Piece of Me Tour

Residencies
2015–2019: Pitbull: Time of Our Lives
2020 PPD: Pitbull: Get Ready Vegas

LiveXLive Virtual Concert Series
2020: Pitbull: Live & Timeless

Filmography

Film

Television

Awards and nominations

References

External links

 
 Pitbull on Vevo
 Pitbull on YouTube
 Pitbull on Spotify
 

1981 births
Living people
21st-century American male musicians
21st-century American rappers
American entertainers of Cuban descent
American hip hop singers
American male pop singers
American male rappers
American musicians of Cuban descent
American reggaeton musicians
Grammy Award winners
Hispanic and Latino American musicians
Hispanic and Latino American rappers
Latin Grammy Award winners
Latin music songwriters
Musicians from Miami
NASCAR team owners
Opposition_to_Fidel_Castro
Pop rappers
Rappers from Miami
RCA Records artists
Songwriters from Florida
Sony Music Latin artists
Spanish-language singers of the United States
TVT Records artists
Victor Entertainment artists
Fifa World Cup ceremonies performers